The Order of the Star of Ghana is the highest award given by the Government of Ghana to any individual who had helped the cause of the country in one way or the other. Recipients of this award are decorated at a state function, chaired by the President of the Republic.

Grades 

 Companion (CSG) - Honorary Division, Civil Division
 Officer (OSG) - Honorary Division, Civil Division, Military Division
 Member (MSG) - Honorary Division, Civil Division, Military Division, Police Division

Insignia 
The ribbon is tricolor (green, yellow, red).

The badge is a star with seven thick points, with in its center, an eagle and a five-pointed star.

Recipients
Companions of the Star of Ghana (CSG)
 Joseph Hanson Kwabena Nketia (2000) 
Queen Elizabeth II (2007) (Honorary)
Charles III (2018) (Honorary)
Major Seth Anthony (2006)
 Nana Addo Dankwa Akufo-Addo (2008) 
 Otumfuo Osei Tutu II  (2008) 
 Alhaji Aliu Mahama (2008) 
 Professor John Evans Atta Mills (2008) 
 Dr. Kwadwo Afari-Gyan (2015)  
 Michael Adenyi Ishola Adenuga Jnr (2016) 
 Alassane Ouattara (2017)  (Honorary division)
 Mohammed VI of Morocco (2017)
 Sun Baohong (2017)  (Honorary division)
Giorgio Napolitano (2006) Honorary (President of Italy 2006-2015)
Queen Beatrix of the Netherlands (2008) Honorary

See also  
 Orders, decorations, and medals of Ghana

References 

 Royal Collection (UK), Order of the Star of Ghana

Star of Ghana
1960 establishments in Ghana
Awards established in 1960